Rekhmire was an ancient Egyptian noble and official of the 18th Dynasty who served as "Governor of the Town" (Thebes) and Vizier during the reigns of Thutmosis III and Amenhotep II, circa 1400 BCE. He was the nephew of Vizier User, who took office at the time of the fifth year of Queen Hatshepsut’s reign. User's official titles included mayor of the city, vizier, and prince. Rekhmire is noted for constructing a lavishly decorated tomb for himself in Sheikh Abd el-Qurna, part of the Theban Necropolis, containing lively, well preserved scenes of daily life during the Egyptian New Kingdom. His tomb is also important as it contains a full copy of a text detailing the duties of the office of the vizier, known as the Installation of the Vizier.

He was also High Priest of Annu or Heliopolis. The cause of his political and personal downfall remains unclear. It is suspected that he fell into disgrace and was deposed. His tomb was Theban Tomb 100.

References

External links
 The Tomb of Rekhmire
 Regulation laid upon the vizier Rekhmire
 

Viziers of the Eighteenth Dynasty of Egypt
Ancient Egyptian priests